1791 Naval Air Squadron of the Fleet Air Arm of the Royal Navy was formed on 15 March 1945 at Lee-on-Solent as a night fighter squadron. It was equipped with the Fairey Firefly NF.Mk I, which was fitted with radar in a centre-line container. The squadron joined HMS Puncher in June for deck landing practice but saw no action. Following VJ day the squadron was disbanded on 23 September 1945 at RNAS Burscough.

References

Military units and formations established in 1945
1700 series Fleet Air Arm squadrons